William Sanderson Fitzgerald (12 November 1838 – 27 January 1920) was a New Zealand teacher and educationalist. He was born in Musselburgh, Midlothian, Scotland on 12 November 1838. In 1861, he was appointed by the Free Church of Scotland to be the principal of a Presbyterian boarding and day school in Pigeon Bay on Banks Peninsula in New Zealand's South Island. He and his wife reached Lyttelton in October 1861. At Pigeon Bay, they had twins on 20 March 1862, including the cricketer James Fitzgerald.

Fitzgerald moved to Oamaru in 1869, and in 1876 was appointed to establish the Otago Normal School in Dunedin.

References

1838 births
1920 deaths
19th-century New Zealand educators
Scottish emigrants to New Zealand